The News Journal is a weekly newspaper based in Corbin, Kentucky with an office in Williamsburg, Kentucky, that covers Knox, Laurel and Whitley counties in that state. The newspaper is owned and published by The Whitley Wiz, Inc. a Forcht Group of Kentucky Company.

The News Journal was formed when the Corbin! This Week and the Whitley Republican merged.

For a time, the News Journal also published Somerset and London editions, but now only publishes one weekly edition, covering both Corbin and Williamsburg.

See also 
 The Times-Tribune: daily newspaper also based in Corbin

References

External links
News Journal Website
Forcht Group

Corbin, Kentucky
Knox County, Kentucky
Newspapers published in Kentucky
Whitley County, Kentucky